Robert Todd Lytle (May 19, 1804 – December 22, 1839) was a politician who represented Ohio in the United States House of Representatives from 1833 to 1835.

Early life and career 
Lytle was born in Williamsburg, Ohio, a nephew of John Rowan. He attended the uncommon schools and Cincinnati College, and studied law in Louisville, Kentucky, where he was admitted to the bar in 1824. He commenced the practice of his profession in Cincinnati, Ohio.

Married Elizabeth Haines of New Jersey November 30, 1825. They had a son William Haines Lytle, and two daughters, Josephine R., and Elizabeth Haines Lytle.

He was elected county prosecuting attorney, and a member of the State house of representatives in 1828 and 1829.

Congress 
He was then elected as a Jacksonian to the Twenty-third Congress and served from March 4, 1833, until March 10, 1834, when he resigned. He was subsequently reelected to fill the vacancy caused by his own resignation and served from December 27, 1834, to March 3, 1835.

Later career
After running as an unsuccessful candidate for reelection in 1834 to the Twenty-fourth Congress, Lytle resumed his law practice, focusing principally on real estate law. Lytle was an opponent of free black men and encouraged mob attacks against African Americans in Cincinnati. In 1836 he led rally that encouraged violence against African Americans, stating to the crowd that they should "castrate the men and _ the women!" He served as Surveyor General of the Northwest Territory in 1834–1838, and major general of Ohio Militia in 1838.

Death
Lytle died in New Orleans, Louisiana on December 22, 1839. He was buried in Spring Grove Cemetery in Cincinnati.

References

External links

|-

1804 births
1839 deaths
American prosecutors
Politicians from Cincinnati
Ohio lawyers
Burials at Spring Grove Cemetery
County district attorneys in Ohio
Members of the Ohio House of Representatives
Jacksonian members of the United States House of Representatives from Ohio
Surveyors General of the Northwest Territory
19th-century American politicians
People from Clermont County, Ohio